In differential geometry, an equiareal map, sometimes called an authalic map, is a smooth map from one surface to another that preserves the areas of figures.

Properties
If M and N are two Riemannian (or pseudo-Riemannian) surfaces, then an equiareal map f from M to N can be characterized by any of the following equivalent conditions:
 The surface area of f(U) is equal to the area of U for every open set U on M.
 The pullback of the area element μN on N is equal to μM, the area element on M.
 At each point p of M, and tangent vectors v and w to M at p,</p><p>where  denotes the Euclidean wedge product of vectors and df denotes the pushforward along f.

Example
An example of an equiareal map, due to Archimedes of Syracuse, is the projection from the unit sphere  to the unit cylinder  outward from their common axis.  An explicit formula is

for (x, y, z) a point on the unit sphere.

Linear transformations
Every Euclidean isometry of the Euclidean plane is equiareal, but the converse is not true. In fact, shear mapping and squeeze mapping are counterexamples to the converse.

Shear mapping takes a rectangle to a parallelogram of the same area. Written in matrix form, a shear mapping along the -axis is 

Squeeze mapping lengthens and contracts the sides of a rectangle in a reciprocal manner so  that the area is preserved. Written in matrix form, with λ > 1 the squeeze reads

A linear transformation  multiplies  areas by the absolute value of its determinant . 

Gaussian elimination shows that every equiareal linear transformation (rotations included) can be obtained by composing at most two shears along the axes, a squeeze and (if the determinant is negative), a reflection.

In map projections

In the context of geographic maps, a map projection is called equal-area, equivalent, authalic, equiareal, or area-preserving, if areas are preserved up to a constant factor; embedding the target map, usually considered a subset of R2, in the obvious way in R3, the requirement above then is weakened to:

For examples of such projections, see equal-area map projection.

See also
 Jacobian matrix and determinant

References

Differential geometry
Functions and mappings